Trees and forests play multiple roles in J. R. R. Tolkien's fantasy world of Middle-earth, some such as Old Man Willow indeed serving as characters in the plot. Both for Tolkien personally, and in his Middle-earth writings, caring about trees really mattered. Indeed, the Tolkien scholar Matthew Dickerson wrote "It would be difficult to overestimate the importance of trees in the writings of J. R. R. Tolkien."

Tolkien stated that primeval human understanding was communion with other living things; critics note that Middle-earth was set in the distant past, when primeval forests still existed. Forests play varying roles in his books. In The Hobbit, Mirkwood is the dark forbidding forest of fairy tale. In The Lord of the Rings, forests are more complex; some trees are woken up by the Elves, while others are going bad. Fangorn Forest is the realm of Treebeard, a tree-giant or Ent, who herds trees including the Huorns which are halfway between Ents and trees, either becoming animated or reverting to becoming treelike.

Some specific kinds of tree are important in Tolkien's stories, such as the tall Mallorn trees at the heart of Lothlórien. In Tom Bombadil's Old Forest, Old Man Willow is a malign and fallen tree-spirit of great age, controlling much of the forest. Early in the creation, the Two Trees of Valinor, one silver, one gold, gave light to the paradisiacal realm of Valinor.

Commentators have written that trees gave Tolkien a way of expressing his eco-criticism, opposed to damaging industrialisation.

Forests in Middle-earth 

Tolkien makes use of forests across Middle-earth, from the Trollshaws and Mirkwood in The Hobbit, reappearing in The Lord of the Rings, to the Old Forest, Lothlórien, and Fangorn which feature in chapters of The Lord of the Rings, and the great forests of Beleriand and Valinor mentioned in The Silmarillion. Indeed, while Middle-earth was still "in a twilight under the stars", the "oldest living things had arisen: ... on earth, the shadows of great trees". For Tolkien critic Tom Shippey, the mention of Mirkwood is an echo of the Norse mythology of the Elder Edda, with the pathless forests of the North over the Misty Mountains mentioned in one of the poems in the Edda, the Skirnismal. 

The Tolkien scholars Shelley Saguaro and Deborah Cogan Thacker write that while it might seem that Tolkien is using trees and forests mainly to represent the natural world, as against the industrial modern world, they are rather "a multi-layered portrayal, with subtle links to fairy tale and folklore, and complex psychological symbolism." They note that forests recur in fairy stories, as places where the protagonist becomes lost, where witches and woodcutters and wolves live. They recall that in Tree and Leaf, Tolkien's account of fairy tales, such stories are in his words "unanalysable .. outside Time itself maybe". They mention the psychoanalyst Bruno Bettelheim's interpretation, that going into the forest "signifies a psychoanalytic space – a place separated from everyday experience in which to be lost is to be found", and Jack Zipes's alternative view, based on his analysis of the Brothers Grimm, that the forest makes enchantment possible, because the conventions of society do not apply there. They note, too, Tolkien's own position, which is that the primeval human understanding was, as he wrote in Tree and Leaf, "communion with other living things", now lost. They cite the Tolkien scholar Paul Kocher as stating that Middle-earth is meant to be the Earth itself in the distant past, when the primeval forests still existed, and with them, a wholeness that is also now lost. As for Mirkwood, they write, its role in The Hobbit is both to be the dark forbidding forest of fairy tale as Bilbo pursues his quest as in "a classical quest narrative", and to have the familiar qualities of a real wood. The forests and trees of The Lord of the Rings are, however, "much more complex": trees may change, whether by being "woken up by Elves" as were the Ents, or "going bad" like some of the trees in the Old Forest.

Saguaro and Thacker comment that Tolkien clearly loved trees; he was often photographed with them, such as with the large black pine in the Oxford Botanic Garden. The "mythical mallorn" tree may be magical: but for Tolkien, all trees were, they write, in some sense "magical". Dickerson adds that Tolkien used a tree as a picture of his own subcreation in Leaf by Niggle; and when his friend C. S. Lewis died, he applied the picture to himself, writing that he felt "like an old tree that is losing all its leaves one by one: this feels like an axe-blow near the roots".

Ents 

Fangorn forest is the realm of Treebeard (also called Fangorn), a tree-giant or Ent (from the Old English for "giant"), one of the oldest living things, or actually the oldest living thing, in Middle-earth. The Ents are tree-herds; they look much like trees, though they have branch-like arms, root-like legs, faces, and the ability to move and speak. Among their charges are the Huorns, which are either trees in the process of becoming animated, or Ents that are reverting to becoming treelike.

Tree species in Middle-earth 

Specific kinds of tree also play a role, such as the tall Mallorn trees of  Lothlórien; Galadriel gives Sam Gamgee a seed of the more or less magical Mallorn. After "the Scouring of the Shire", he plants it in the party field, near the centre of the Shire, to replace the much-loved tree there cut down by Sharkey's men. When Frodo enters Lothlórien and first acquaints himself with the Mallorn trees: "He felt a delight in wood and the touch of it, neither as forester nor as carpenter; it was the delight of the living tree itself."

Tolkien's poem "Sing all ye joyful!" at the end of The Hobbit has in its last verse a mention of six kinds of tree:

The last phrase naming three English trees echoes Rudyard Kipling's "A Tree Song", with its refrain:  

The Tolkien scholar Tom Shippey writes that while Tolkien does not mention Kipling, he shares the "theme of unchanging Englishness" seen in Kipling's writing. Tolkien names the same three trees in Tree and Leaf: "Each leaf, of oak and ash and thorn, is a unique embodiment of the pattern..."; Saguaro and Thacker write that this is "a plea for the 'recovery fairy stories help us to make'". Dale Nelson in the J.R.R. Tolkien Encyclopedia writes that the affinity of Kipling's Puck for these three trees "make him kin to Bombadil and Treebeard".

Individual trees

Mythic symbols 

The Two Trees of Valinor, Telperion and Laurelin, one silver, one gold, gave light to the paradisiacal realm of Valinor, where "Through long ages the Valar dwelt in bliss in the light of the Trees beyond the Mountains of Aman". This continued until they were destroyed by the evil giant spider Ungoliant and the first Dark Lord, Melkor, leaving only a flower and a fruit which became the Moon and the Sun for Middle-earth. The Tolkien scholar Matthew Dickerson writes that the Two Trees are "the most important mythic symbols in all of the legendarium".

The White Tree in the court at the top of Minas Tirith was the symbol of the Kings of Gondor. During the many years when that land was ruled by Stewards in the absence of a King, the White Tree was dead and leafless but still honoured. On Aragorn's return to the city, as described in The Return of the King, he climbs Mount Mindolluin behind the citadel, and finds a seedling of the same tree that had somehow germinated there in the snow. He returns with it to the citadel and plants it in the court, where it quickly comes to flower. Saguaro and Thacker call this "deliberately religious language and imagery". Dickerson writes that it is the symbol of Aragorn's kingship, being descended from Nimloth, the White Tree of Numenor, itself descended from Telperion.

Fallen nature 

Old Man Willow is a malign tree-spirit of great age in Tom Bombadil's Old Forest, appearing physically as a large willow tree beside the River Withywindle, but spreading his influence throughout the forest, who as Tolkien explains 

Saguaro and Thacker comment that critics have puzzled over this depiction, as it does not fit with Tolkien's image as an environmentalist "tree-hugger". They write that trees (like other creatures) are in Tolkien's world subject to the corruption of the Fall of Man, mentioning Tolkien's Catholicism. They state that while Tolkien's writings on the meaning of trees verges on the pagan, both the Old and the New Testament use trees as symbols, the Tree of Knowledge of Good and Evil in Genesis, the Cross, the tree of death in the Gospels, and the Tree of Life in Revelation (22:2); and that Tolkien succeeds in "bring[ing] all these elements together" in The Lord of the Rings: death, creation, sub-creation, re-creation. Dickerson writes that Old Man Willow indicates both that nature, like Man, is fallen, and that it is actively hostile to Man. The Tolkien critic Jared Lobdell compares the "treachery of natural things in an animate world" seen in the character of Old Man Willow to Algernon Blackwood's story "The Willows".

Eco-criticism in Tolkien's writings 

Dickerson comments that trees provide "a potent vehicle for [Tolkien's] eco-criticism."  The party tree in Hobbiton near the centre of the Shire appears at the beginning and the end of The Lord of the Rings: at the start, as the tree that just happens to be in the party field, a happy place; at the end, cut down by Saruman's ruffians to no useful purpose. Dickerson writes that Saruman's "evil ways" are revealed exactly by his "wanton destruction" of Fangorn's trees, and notes that Treebeard calls Saruman an "accursed tree-slayer".  The Tolkien critic Paul Kocher notes that Treebeard says that ents have a far closer sympathy for trees than shepherds do for their sheep, because "ents are 'good at getting inside other things'". He also cites Treebeard's statement that he is "not altogether on anybody's side, because nobody is altogether on my side ... nobody cares for the woods as I care for them", but notes that all the same, he is driven by the knowledge that Saruman has taken sides in the War of the Ring to take action against him. He destroys Saruman's industrial Isengard, whose factories Saruman was fuelling by cutting down Treebeard's trees. After the destruction of the One Ring, Aragorn gives wide lands for new forest; but, Kocher writes, Tolkien gives "ominous hints that the wild wood will not prosper in the expanding Age of Man" that will follow.

See also 

 Sacred trees and groves in Germanic paganism and mythology

References

Primary 

This list identifies each item's location in Tolkien's writings.

Secondary

Sources 

  
 
 
 
 
 
 
 

 
Fictional trees
Themes of The Lord of the Rings